2019 BO is a tiny near-Earth asteroid of the Apollo group. It was first observed by the Catalina Sky Survey at the Mount Lemmon Observatory on 7 January 2019.

See also 
 List of asteroid close approaches to Earth in 2019

References

External links 
 
 
 

Minor planet object articles (unnumbered)
Near-Earth objects in 2019
Astronomical objects discovered in 2019